Zoran "Žota" Antonijević (Serbian Cyrillic: Зоран Антонијевић; 21 October 1945 – 5 February 2008) was a Serbian midfielder who played for SFR Yugoslavia.

External links

 Profile at Serbian federation site
 Necrology

1945 births
Footballers from Belgrade
2008 deaths
Serbian footballers
Yugoslav footballers
Yugoslavia international footballers
Association football midfielders
Yugoslav First League players
Red Star Belgrade footballers
Red Star Belgrade non-playing staff
Super League Greece players
Iraklis Thessaloniki F.C. players
Yugoslav expatriate footballers
Serbian expatriate footballers
Expatriate footballers in Greece